Cophomantella cyclopodes is a moth in the family Lecithoceridae. It was described by Edward Meyrick in 1922. It is known to exist in Tanzania.

The forewings are dark purplish fuscous with a large rounded-transverse pale ochreous spot on the costa at three-fourths. The hindwings are dark grey.

References

Endemic fauna of Tanzania
Moths described in 1922
Cophomantella
Taxa named by Edward Meyrick